Glaciimonas frigoris is a Gram-negative, psychrophilic, rod-shaped and motile bacteria from the genus of Glaciimonas which has been isolated from the permafrost from Siberia. Glasciimonas frigoris has been shown to grow well in temperatures ranging from -5 °C to 25 °C (23 °F to 77 °F).

References

External links
Type strain of Glaciimonas frigoris at BacDive -  the Bacterial Diversity Metadatabase

Burkholderiales
Bacteria described in 2016